The 2012 Drake Bulldogs football team represented Drake University as member of the Pioneer Football League (PFL) during the 2012 NCAA Division I FCS football season. Led by fifth-year head coach Chris Creighton, the Bulldogs compiled and overall record of 8–3 with a mark of 7–1 in conference play, sharing the PFL title with Butler and San Diego. This was the second consecutive season that Drake claimed a share of the conference championship. The team played home games at Drake Stadium in Des Moines, Iowa.

Schedule

References

External links
 2012 Drake Football Media Guide

Drake
Drake Bulldogs football seasons
Pioneer Football League champion seasons
Drake Bulldogs football